Collection is a 2002 compilation album from Swedish "dansband" Arvingarna.

Track listing
Eloise
Jeannie (Jeannie's Coming Back)
I gult och blått (No hay nada màs)
Angelina
Räck mig din hand
Coola killar
En 68:a cabriolet
Sången till Jennifer
Magdalena
Ock hon sa
Rakt in i hjärtat
Tjejer
Granna Anna
De ensammas promenad
Natt efter natt
Än finns det kärlek
Ring om du vill någonting
Du och jag
Om dessa väggar kunde tala
Pamela

References

2002 albums
Arvingarna albums